Kelly Kristen Rulon (born August 16, 1984 in Point Loma, California) is an American water polo player. She won a gold medal with the United States at the 2012 Summer Olympics in the water polo competition. She is also a bronze medalist from the 2004 Summer Olympics. Her position is driver.

Rulon is a two-time medalist (one gold and silver) at the World Championships.

High school and college
At University of San Diego High School, Kelly Rulon was a four-time first-team all-league, all-city and All-California Interscholastic Federation selection, as well as Most Valuable Player of her team each year she played.

As a freshman in 2003, Rulon was second on the UCLA Bruins with 27 goals, 26 assists and 27 steals, and scored once in the Bruins' 4-3 victory over Stanford University in the NCAA Women's Water Polo Championship; she finished with six post-season goals.

Returning from the Olympics in her 2005 season, Rulon led her team in scoring with 70 goals, as well as multi-goal games (22), assists (48), steals (72) and post-season goals (12). She led the Bruins to the NCAA title with a 33-0 record and was named a first-team All-American by the American Water Polo Coaches Association. When UCLA defeated Stanford University in the NCAA final, Rulon, who scored three goals in the semifinal win over Hawaii, led UCLA in scoring for the season and post-season.

As a junior, Rulon was selected the Most Valuable Player of the 2006 NCAA Tournament after leading UCLA to its second consecutive and fourth overall NCAA title. She scored 11 goals in the three games to set a new NCAA Tournament record. In the 9-8 championship victory over the University of Southern California, Rulon scored four goals and set up the game-winner by drawing an ejection foul with four seconds to play.

During her senior year, Rulon had 70 goals, totaled a team-high 52 assists and team-leading 42 steals, and recorded seven blocks and 26 earned exclusions, both totals ranking second-highest on the club. She scored in 26 matches and posted 16 multi-goal efforts. Then she registered a season-high six goals against Loyola Marymount (March 31). Another highlight was the five goals she scored twice – versus Santa Clara (Feb. 24) and UC San Diego (March 16). Rulan had six four-goal performances and had netted 19 goals in a four-game span. She and her team-mates led UCLA to the school's 100th NCAA National Championship (a new record).

In 2007, Rulon was named winner of the Peter J. Cutino Award, which is given to the college Player-of-the-Year in water polo. She joined other UCLA Bruins, Coralie Simmons (2001), Natalie Golda (2005), and Courtney Mathewson (2008), as the school's four UCLA female Peter J. Cutino Award winners, all coached by Adam Krikorian.
.

International and Olympics
Rulon received MVP honors at the 1999 Junior Olympics and was five-time Junior Olympics First-Team All-American. She played in the 2002 Junior Pan American Championships, where she was the tournament's leading scorer.
In 2004, Rulon redshirted to play in the Summer Olympics in Athens, Greece. She scored four goals in the Olympics including the game-winning goal against Hungary in the opening game. The US women won the bronze medal by defeating Australia. After the 2005 collegiate season, Rulon played for the U.S. National Team that won a silver medal in the 2005 FINA World Championships in Canada.

During 2009 FINA World Championship in Rome, which saw US women team winning the gold medal, Kelly Rulon scored last two goals of the final match against Canada. She was also awarded of the Gold Cap as tournament's best player.

Kelly currently trains with the USA Water Polo National Team and in October 2011 helped lead Team USA to the gold medal at the Pan American games.

In 2012, Rulon played in the Summer Olympics in London, England.  She assisted the US women's team win the gold medal, against Spain. The final score of the final match in London against Spain was 8-5.

Clubs
Rulon left UCLA after 2007 College season for moving into Europe. In the same year she joined the A.S.D Roma team playing in the Italian Women's Waterpolo Championship. With A.S.D. Roma she won that year the LEN Cup, as best scorer of final match in Padua.
Rulon played 2008/09 season for Nervi, being the scoring leader in the Italian Championship (81 goals)
After her coming back in Rome she scored 58 goals in the 2009/10 season.

Awards
In 2020, Rulon was inducted into the USA Water Polo Hall of Fame.

Personal
Kelly Rulon majored in history at UCLA. Rulon's younger sister, Katie, was also a member of the UCLA water polo team.

See also
 United States women's Olympic water polo team records and statistics
 List of Olympic champions in women's water polo
 List of Olympic medalists in water polo (women)
 List of world champions in women's water polo
 List of World Aquatics Championships medalists in water polo

References

External links
 
 Kelly Rulon: UCLA Team biography
 San Diego Hall of Champions: Kelly Rulon, 2005 Amateur Star of the Year

1984 births
Living people
Sportspeople from San Diego
American female water polo players
Water polo drivers
Water polo players at the 2004 Summer Olympics
Water polo players at the 2012 Summer Olympics
Medalists at the 2004 Summer Olympics
Medalists at the 2012 Summer Olympics
Olympic gold medalists for the United States in water polo
Olympic bronze medalists for the United States in water polo
World Aquatics Championships medalists in water polo
Water polo players at the 2011 Pan American Games
Pan American Games medalists in water polo
Pan American Games gold medalists for the United States
UCLA Bruins women's water polo players
Medalists at the 2011 Pan American Games
University of San Diego High School alumni